The 2011–2012 Israel Football League was the fifth season of the Israel Football League (IFL). The league expanded to ten teams with two expansion teams; the Petah-Tikva Troopers and the Nahariya Northern Stars. The season concluded with the Tel Aviv Sabres defeating the Tel Aviv Pioneers in Israel Bowl V.

Regular season 
The regular season consisted of 10 games for each team.

Playoffs

Wild Card games 

 Pioneers 34 – 6 Kings

 Rebels 47 – 91 Underdogs

Division Championships 

 Lions 22 – 66  Pioneers

 Sabres 34 – 12 Underdogs

Israel Bowl V 

Sabres 44 - 42 Pioneers

Awards 

 Most Valuable Player: Chaim Schiff, QB, Jerusalem Lions
 Offensive Player-of-the-Year: Adi Hakami, QB, Tel Aviv/Jaffa Sabres
 Defensive Player-of-the-Year: Adam Zinker, DE/OLB, Tel Aviv/Jaffa Sabres
 Special Teams Player-of-the-Year:: Liran Zamir, K/P, Judean Rebels
 Coach-of-the-Year: Ori Shterenbach, Haifa Underdogs
 Rookie-of-the-Year: Chris Clark, RB/DB, Haifa Underdogs
 Newcomer-of-the-Year: Barak Katzir, DB/KR, Haifa Underdogs

References

Israel Football League Seasons